Jalapa is an unincorporated community in Newberry County, South Carolina, United States. The elevation is 564 feet.

References

Unincorporated communities in South Carolina
Unincorporated communities in Newberry County, South Carolina